Alan Jay Heeger (born January 22, 1936) is an American physicist, academic and Nobel Prize laureate in chemistry.

Heegar was elected as a member into the National Academy of Engineering in 2002 for co-founding the field of conducting polymers and for pioneering work in making these novel materials available for technological applications.

Life and career
Heeger was born in Sioux City, Iowa, to a Jewish family.  He grew up in Akron, Iowa, where his father owned a general store.  At age nine, following his father's death, the family moved to Sioux City.

Heeger earned a B.S. in physics and mathematics from the University of Nebraska-Lincoln in 1957, and a Ph.D in physics from the University of California, Berkeley in 1961.  From 1962 to 1982 he was on the faculty of the University of Pennsylvania. In 1982 he commenced his present appointment as a professor in the Physics Department and the Materials Department at the University of California, Santa Barbara. His research has led to the formation of numerous start-up companies including Uniax, Konarka, and Sirigen, founded in 2003 by Guillermo C. Bazan, Patrick J. Dietzen, Brent S. Gaylord. Alan Heeger was a founder of Uniax, which was acquired by DuPont.

He won the Nobel Prize for Chemistry in 2000 along with Alan G. MacDiarmid and Hideki Shirakawa "for their discovery and development of conductive polymers"; They published their results on polyacetylene a conductive polymer in 1977. This led to the construction of the Su–Schrieffer–Heeger model, a simple model for topological insulators.

He had won the Oliver E. Buckley Prize of the American Physical Society in 1983 and, in 1995, the Balzan Prize for Science of Non-Biological Materials.

His sons are the neuroscientist David Heeger and the immunologist Peter Heeger.

In October 2010, Heeger participated in the USA Science and Engineering Festival's Lunch with a Laureate program where middle and high school students engage in an informal conversation with a Nobel Prize-winning scientist over a brown-bag lunch. Heeger is also a member of the USA Science and Engineering Festival's Advisory Board. Heeger has been a judge of the STAGE International Script Competition three times (2006, 2007, 2010).

"Perhaps the greatest pleasure of being a scientist is to have an abstract idea, then to do an experiment (more often a series of experiments is required) that demonstrates the idea was correct; that is, Nature actually behaves as conceived in the mind of the scientist. This process is the essence of creativity in science. I have been fortunate to have experienced this intense pleasure many times in my life." 
Alan J Heeger, Never Lose Your Nerve!

Publication list

Journal Articles:

Technical Reports:
Heeger, A. J. and A. G. MacDiarmid. "Polyacetylene, (CH)x, as an Emerging Material for Solar Cell Applications. Final Technical Report, March 19, 1979 - March 18, 1980," University of Pennsylvania, United States Department of Energy, (June 5, 1980).
Heeger, A. J., Sinclair, M., et al. "Subgap Absorption in Conjugated Polymers," Sandia National Laboratory, United States Department of Energy, (1991).
Heeger, A. J., Sinclair, M., et al. " Measurements of Photo-induced Changes in Conjugated Polymers," Sandia National Laboratory, United States Department of Energy, (1991).

Autobiography
, World Scientific Publishing,

See also
 List of Nobel laureates affiliated with the University of California, Santa Barbara

References

External links
Curriculum Vitae of Alan J. Heeger, posted at University of California, Santa Barbara. Retrieved November 18, 2007
  including the Nobel lecture December 8, 2000 Semiconducting and Metallic Polymers: The Fourth Generation of Polymeric Materials
Free to view video interview, Harry Kroto NL talks to Alan Heeger, 2005, provided by the Vega Science Trust
UCSB profile
Photos and video from presentation in Brno University of Technology, Czech Republic

1936 births
Living people
Nobel laureates in Chemistry
American Nobel laureates
Members of the United States National Academy of Sciences
Foreign members of the Chinese Academy of Sciences
21st-century American physicists
Jewish American scientists
Jewish physicists
Molecular electronics
Organic semiconductors
Polymer scientists and engineers
People from Sioux City, Iowa
University of Nebraska–Lincoln alumni
University of California, Berkeley alumni
University of California, Santa Barbara faculty
Members of the United States National Academy of Engineering
Fellows of the American Physical Society
Oliver E. Buckley Condensed Matter Prize winners
People from Akron, Iowa